The fourth season of the long-running Australian outback drama McLeod's Daughters began airing on 11 February 2004 and concluded on 24 November 2004 with a total of 32 episodes. This is the first season to not feature Lisa Chappell as Claire McLeod and Jessica Napier as Becky Howard, as both actresses left the series in the third season. Becky left to be with boyfriend Jake and Claire McLeod died at the end of the third season.

Bridie Carter (Tess), Simmone Jade Mackinnon (Stevie), Rachael Carpani (Jodi), Aaron Jeffery (Alex), and Myles Pollard (Nick) all return to the series main cast this season. Sonia Todd (Meg) returned to the main cast until her character left for Melbourne; she recurred thereafter. Michala Banas joins the cast this season as Kate Manfredi, a friend of Jodi's. Brett Tucker returns in a recurring role as Dave Brewer, but is added to the main cast at the end of the season.

The season was the third most watched series on Australian television for 2004. It was the most watched television drama on Australian television, averaging 1.51 million viewers, up from the previous season.

Plot 
Tess, now without her sister, has to find the strength to rebuild her life and take control of the Drovers' legacy. She faces challenges including her relationship and marriage with Nick, Peter returning for custody of Charlotte, working Stevie and accepting her as her partner on Drover's, and being the glue that holds Drover's together.

Stevie deals with settling down on Drover's and finding the strength to build a relationship with her daughter, Rose, who believes Stevie is her aunt. Stevie's ex-husband returns to win her back, but budding relationships with newcomer Kane Morgan and with Alex make her realize that her marriage is in the past. Tess asks Stevie to continue on Drover's, but as her partner.

Jodi and Meg both are trying to make the best decisions for their lives. Meg takes a chance and goes to Melbourne for a job opportunity, while Jodi takes on more responsibility on Drover's and with the CFS, while pursuing a relationship with Kane's younger brother, Luke.

The Ryan boys face the marriage of Harry and Sandra, while they both move back to Killarney. Alex tries to push away his feelings for Stevie, while Nick continues to grow with his relationship and later marriage to Tess.

Together, Nick and Tess have a bump in the road when Sally returns at the end of the season with news that will change Nick's and Tess' lives forever.

Cast

Main
 Bridie Carter as Tess Silverman McLeod Ryan
 Simmone Jade Mackinnon as Stevie Hall
 Rachael Carpani as Jodi Fountain
 Aaron Jeffery as Alex Ryan
 Myles Pollard as Nick Ryan
 Sonia Todd as Meg Fountain (episodes 1–14; recurring after)
 Michala Banas as Kate Manfredi (episode 14—)
 Brett Tucker as Dave Brewer (episode 27—; recurring previously)

Recurring
 John Jarratt as Terry Dodge
 Brooke, Kaitlyn and Tahlia Stacey-Clark as Charlotte McLeod
 Marshall Napier as Harry Ryan
 Inge Hornstra as Sandra Kinsella Ryan
 Dean O'Gorman as Luke Morgan
 Craig McLachlan as Kane Morgan
 Reece Horner as Nat
 Luke Ford as Craig Woodland

Guest
 Harold Hopkins as Ken Logan
 Tasma Walton as Tracy Morrison
 Paul Kelmen as Dale Holloway
 Rodger Corser as Peter Johnson
 John Stanton as Bryce Redstaff
 Carmel Johnson as Beth Martin
 Grant Bowler as Jared Wuchowski
 Glenda Linscott as Celia Rivers
 Basia A'Hern as Rose Hall Smith
 Catherine Wilkin as Liz Ryan
 Anna Torv as Jasmine McLeod
 Kathryn Hartman as Sally Clemments

Episodes

Reception

Ratings
On average, the fourth season of McLeod's Daughters was watched by 1.51 million viewers, tied with Season 1. It was the most-watched Australian drama of 2004, and ranked at #3 for its fourth season.

Awards and nominations
The fourth season of McLeod's Daughters received one win and four nominations at the 2005 Logie Awards.

Wins
 Logie Award for Most Popular Australian Drama Series

Nominations
 Gold Logie Award for Most Popular Personality on Australian Television (Bridie Carter)
 Logie Award for Most Popular Actress (Bridie Carter)
 Logie Award for Most Popular Actor (Aaron Jeffery)
 Logie Award for Most Popular New Male Talent (Dean O'Gorman)

Home media

References

External links
 McLeod's Daughters Official Website
 

McLeod's Daughters seasons
2004 Australian television seasons